Greenwood station is an MBTA Commuter Rail station on the Haverhill Line located in the Greenwood neighborhood of Wakefield, Massachusetts. The station consists of two side platforms serving the line's two tracks. The low-level platforms are not accessible.

The ticket office in the station building closed on February 22, 1952. By 1962, the former station building was relocated to the Pleasure Island amusement park for use on an antique railroad.

References

External links

MBTA - Greenwood
Station from Greenwood Street from Google Maps Street View

Buildings and structures in Wakefield, Massachusetts
MBTA Commuter Rail stations in Middlesex County, Massachusetts